Lugnut or lug nut may refer to:
Lug nut, a fastener that secures a wheel to a vehicle
Lugnut (Transformers), a Decepticon from Transformers: Animated
Lugnutz, a Decepticon from Transformers: Cybertron
Lansing Lugnuts, a baseball team

See also
Longnut, an extinct species of freshwater mussel
Wingnut (disambiguation)